This is a  list of Ministers of Finance of Malawi before and after independence.

Ministers

Colonial Era 
Henry Phillips, 1963-1964

Post-Colonial Era 
John Tembo, 1964-1969
Aleke Banda, 1969-1972
Dick Matenje, 1972-1978
Edward Bwanali, 1978-1980
Louis Chimango, 1980-1981
Chakakala Chaziya, 1981-1984
Edward Bwanali, 1984-1986
Stephen Chimwemwe Hara, 1986
Dalton Katopola, 1986-1987
Louis Chimango, 1987-1994
Aleke Banda, 1994-1997
Cassim Chilumpha, 1997-2000
Mathews Chikaonda, 2000-2002
Friday Jumbe, 2002-2004
Goodall Gondwe, 2004-2009
Ken Kandodo, 2009-2011
Ken Lipenga, 2011-2013
Maxwell Mkwezalamba, 2013-2014
Goodall Gondwe, 2014-2019
Joseph Mwanamvekha, 2019-2020
Felix Mlusu, 2020-

References

See also 
 Economy of Malawi

Government ministers of Malawi

Economy of Malawi